Proverbs 21 is the 21st chapter of the Book of Proverbs in the Hebrew Bible or the Old Testament of the Christian Bible. The book is a compilation of several wisdom literature collections, with the heading in 1:1 may be intended to regard Solomon as the traditional author of the whole book, but the dates of the individual collections are difficult to determine, and the book probably obtained its final shape in the post-exilic period. This chapter records a part of the second collection of the book.

Text
The original text is written in Hebrew language. This chapter is divided into 31 verses.

Textual witnesses
Some early manuscripts containing the text of this chapter in Hebrew are of the Masoretic Text, which includes the Aleppo Codex (10th century), and Codex Leningradensis (1008).

There is also a translation into Koine Greek known as the Septuagint, made in the last few centuries BC. Extant ancient manuscripts of the Septuagint version include Codex Vaticanus (B; B; 4th century), Codex Sinaiticus (S; BHK: S; 4th century), and Codex Alexandrinus (A; A; 5th century).

Parashot
The parashah sections listed here are based on the Aleppo Codex. {P}: open parashah.
 {P} 19:10–29; 20:1–30; 21:1–30 {P} 21:31; 22:1–29 {P}

Analysis
This chapter belongs to a section regarded as the second collection in the book of Proverbs (comprising Proverbs 10:1–22:16), also called "The First 'Solomonic' Collection" (the second one in Proverbs 25:1–29:27). The collection contains 375 sayings, each of which consists of two parallel phrases, except for Proverbs 19:7 which consists of three parts.

Verse 1
The king's heart is in the hand of the Lord,
as the rivers of water; He turns it to any place He will.’’
"Rivers": can be rendered as "channels" or "streams", like "irrigation channels", which can be directed to where they are needed, so any best-laid human plans and intentions that do not conform to God's purposes will not succeed (verse 30; cf. Psalm 33:10-11).
God has sovereign control of human affairs (cf. verses 30–31). including the actions and decisions of a king—whether willingly (Psalm 78:70) or unwittingly (cf. Jeremiah 25:9)— to achieve divine purposes (cf. 16:1, 9).

Verse 3To do justice and judgment is more acceptable to the Lord than sacrifice. 
"More acceptable" from the Hebrew root verb , bakhar, “to choose”, as Niphal participle can be rendered  as "choice to the Lord” or “chosen of the Lord,” meaning “acceptable to the Lord” (cf. TEV “pleases the Lord more”).
God's priority of righteousness and justice over religious worship rituals or 'sacrifices' is a common prophetic theme (cf. Proverbs 15:8; 21:29; 1 Samuel 15:22; Psalm 40:6–8; Isaiah 1:11–17; Jeremiah 7:21–26; Hosea 6:6; Amos 5:21–27; Micah 6:6–8), and is illustrated by Saul' action (1 Samuel 15).
 Worser than this is the 'evil intent' accompanying the offensiveness of the sacrifices by the wicked (verse 27).

Verse 31The horse is prepared against the day of battle: but safety is of the Lord.''
"Of the Lord”: that is, "accomplished by God", not from human efforts or preparation. This is the basis of prayers on the eve of battle (cf Psalm 20:7; 33:17).

See also

Related Bible parts: Psalm 21, Proverbs 9, Proverbs 18, Proverbs 22, Proverbs 25

References

Sources

External links
 Jewish translations:
 Mishlei - Proverbs - Chapter 21 (Judaica Press) translation [with Rashi's commentary] at Chabad.org
 Christian translations:
 Online Bible at GospelHall.org (ESV, KJV, Darby, American Standard Version, Bible in Basic English)
 Book of Proverbs Chapter 21 King James Version
  Various versions

21